The 21st National Hockey League All-Star Game was played in Maple Leaf Gardens on January 16, 1968, where the host Toronto Maple Leafs battled a team of all-stars from the remaining NHL teams. It was the last time that Maple Leaf Gardens would host the game, and it was also the final game under the Stanley Cup champions-versus-NHL All-Stars format, as the NHL would switch to a divisional format for the game in 1969.

Death of Bill Masterton 
The game, compared to other years, was in a somber mood: two days before, Bill Masterton, a player for the Minnesota North Stars, was hit by two Oakland Seals players on the ice, causing him to lose his balance and hit his head on the ice. Masterton was pronounced dead the next day.

The death of Masterton raised an issue about the use of helmets in hockey - whether they should be mandatory, and whether they affect a player's abilities. Response was mixed in the helmet debate even in the days following Masterton's death: Gordie Howe claimed that he would not, but nevertheless encouraged the next generation of players to do so, while Bobby Hull claimed that he was in serious consideration. At one extreme, Stafford Smythe claimed that helmets should be made mandatory.

As for the game itself, only two players would wear helmets: J. C. Tremblay, who had worn a helmet all season, and Brian Conacher, as a result of Masterton's death. Helmets would not become mandatory in the NHL until 1979, and even then players under contract prior to June 1, 1979 were grandfathered in provided they signed a waiver. Craig MacTavish was the last player to appear in the All-Star Game without a helmet, appearing in the 1996 All-Star Game during his second-to-last season as a player.

On the day of the all-star game, the National Hockey League Writers' Association proposed that a trophy should be presented in Masterton's honor, and by the end of the season, the league made it a reality. The Bill Masterton Memorial Trophy is awarded to each year to the player who best exemplifies dedication, perseverance, and sportsmanship.

As an aside, despite the somber mood, Toronto coach Punch Imlach and his wife celebrated their silver wedding anniversary the night of the All-Star Game.

The game
The 1968 classic was also home to a notable first: because Toronto goaltender Johnny Bower was injured and could not play, he was replaced with Al Smith, their starting minor league goaltender.

As it turned out, this year would be the last in which the defending champions faced off against a team consisting of the "best of the rest" - NHL president Clarence Campbell hinted that the following year would be the first in which there would be an East-versus-West battle, citing that the game could be easily moved to different cities. The 21st classic was also the last in which the teams were determined based on the previous season's First and Second All-Star Teams, a move supported by the absence of then-rookie Bobby Orr in the previous season's game and the fact that the game had moved to mid-season.

Orr was injured in the third period by Pete Stemkowski, breaking his collarbone.

Game summary

MVP: Bruce Gamble, Toronto Maple Leafs
Attendance: 15,753

Source: Podnieks

Rosters

Note: G = Goaltender, D = Defence, C = Centre, LW = Left Wing, RW = Right Wing
Source: Podnieks

See also
1967–68 NHL season

References
 

Notes:

National Hockey League All-Star Games
All-Star Game
1968
Ice hockey competitions in Toronto
National Hockey League All-Star Game
National Hockey League All-Star Game